Iraivan Kodutha Varam is a 1978 Indian Tamil language film directed by A. Bhimsingh. It was released on 22 September 1978.

Plot

Cast 
Rajnikanth as Rajnikanth
 Vijayakumar as Balu
Srikanth as Ramu
 Fatafat Jayalaxmi as Geetha
 Sumithra as Parimala
 Cho Ramaswamy as Raja
 S. N. Lakshmi as Ramu's mother
 Oru Viral Krishna Rao as Rao
 Peelisivam as Gopal
 Veeraghavan as Geetha's father

Soundtrack 
All songs were written by Kannadasan and composed by M. S. Viswanathan.

References

External links 
 

1970s Tamil-language films
1978 films
Films directed by A. Bhimsingh
Films scored by M. S. Viswanathan